A pronoun is a substitute for a noun or a noun phrase, or things previously mentioned or understood from the context. These are words like јас 'I', мене 'me', себе 'himself, herself', ова 'this', кој 'who, which', некој 'somebody', никој 'nobody', сите 'all', секој 'everybody'.

Macedonian pronouns decline for case ('падеж'), i.e., their function in a phrase as subject (ex. јас 'I'), direct object (него 'him'), or object of a preposition (од неа 'from her').

Based on their meaning and the function in the sentence, pronouns fall into the following categories:

Formal and informal "you" pronouns

Use of ти (second-person singular informal) is generally limited to friends and family, and is used among children. In formal usage only Вие (second-person singular formal) occurs; ти may be used among peers in a workplace, but it is rare in official documents. Вие should always be capitalized when used in this way as a sign of respect. Ти, used when referring to God, should also be capitalized.

Personal pronouns

Possessive pronouns

Interrogative pronouns
Interrogative pronouns (прашални заменки) refer to an unknown person, object, quality or quantity and agree with the noun they denote in gender and number. Personal interrogative pronouns have two cases, nominative and genitive. There are also accusative and dative forms: кого and кому, respectively. The more analytical construction на кого is an optional alternative for the dative form. They are also used with nonhuman beings (animals and objects). Quality interrogative pronouns are used for asking one to specify the word in question. They are translated in English as what/what kind of/what sort of.

There is only one interrogative pronoun for quantity — колку and it is invariant for gender and number.  It is used before plural nouns to ask about their quantity (then it is translated as how much/how many), and before an adjective or adverb to ask about the extent, degree, age, etc., of something or somebody (translated as how).

Demonstrative pronominal adjectives

Reflexive pronouns

An alternative full form, себеси, is used for emphasis.

 Ана ѝ ја даде нејзината книга на Марија. (Ana gave her [Maria's] book to Maria.)
 Ана ѝ ја даде својата книга на Марија. (Ana gave her [Ana's] book to Maria.)

Summative pronouns

Negative pronouns

Indefinite pronouns

Relative pronouns

References
Macedonian by Victor Friedman, 2001, p. 29.

Macedonian grammar
Pronouns by language